Columbia, Ohio may refer to:
Columbia, Tuscarawas County, Ohio, an unincorporated community
Columbia, Williams County, Ohio, an unincorporated community
Columbia Township, Hamilton County, Ohio
Columbia Township, Lorain County, Ohio
Columbia Township, Meigs County, Ohio
Columbia, part of the now-merged Columbia-Tusculum, Cincinnati